Paris has a typical oceanic climate (Köppen climate classification: Cfb) which is affected by the North Atlantic Current. The overall climate throughout the year is mild and moderately wet. Each year, however, there are a few days when the temperature rises above . Longer periods of more intense heat sometimes occur, such as the heat wave of 2003 when temperatures exceeded  for weeks, reached  on some days and seldom cooled down at night. Spring and autumn have, on average, mild days and fresh nights but are changing and unstable. Surprisingly warm or cool weather occurs frequently in both seasons. Light night frosts are however quite common, but the temperature will dip below  for only a few days a year. Snow falls every year, but rarely stays on the ground. The city sometimes sees light snow or flurries with or without accumulation. However the city is known for intermittent abrupt heavy showers.

Paris has a rich history of meteorological observations, with some going back as far as 1665.

References

Works cited
 
 

Climate by city
Climate of France